The 1983 Lehigh Engineers football team was an American football team that represented Lehigh University as an independent during the 1983 NCAA Division I-AA football season. 

In their eighth year under head coach John Whitehead, the Engineers compiled an 8–3 record. John Shigo and Lance Williams were the team captains.

Lehigh played its home games at Taylor Stadium on the university's main campus in Bethlehem, Pennsylvania.

Schedule

References

Lehigh
Lehigh Mountain Hawks football seasons
Lehigh Engineers football